Oldeani is an administrative ward in the Karatu district of the Arusha Region of Tanzania. According to the 2002 census, the ward has a total population of 6,870.

References

Karatu District
Wards of Arusha Region